Terisa Tinei Siagatonu is a Samoan award-winning spoken word poet, arts educator, and community organizer.   In 2012, she was awarded a Champion of Change Award for her activism as a spoken word poet and organizer.

Personal life 
Born in San Francisco, CA, Siagatonu was the first on her father's side of the family to attend college. Siagatonu graduated from the University of California, Santa Cruz, with a  While there, she experienced spoken word for the first time and began writing. During college she competed in poetry slams, taught spoken word poetry to students in an after school program, and was a Youth Speaks mentor. After completing undergraduate work with a major in Community Studies and an Education minor, she went on to earn a Master of Arts in Marriage/FamilyTherapy from the University of Southern California.

Career 
She was Project Director for the Pacific Islander Education and Retention project (PIER) at University of California, Los Angeles. 

She is a slam poet, and coach.  An activist in several areas, including LGBTQ rights, racial justice, mental health, gender equity and climate change, President Obama recognized Siagatonu with a Champion of Change Award in 2012, and she spoke at the 2015 United Nations Climate Change Conference. One of her areas of concern is Hawaii’s Mauna Kea volcano.

Her work, A Kundiman Fellow and 2019 Yerba Buena Center for the Arts 100 List Honoree, was published in Poetry Magazine and had been featured on Button Poetry, CNN, NBCNews, NPR, Huffington Post, KQED, Everyday Feminism, The Guardian, BuzzFeed, and Upworthy. 

Siagatonu, being a queer Samoan woman and activist gave her a plethora of opportunities. Such as speaking at the White House (during the Obama administration) to the UN Conference on Climate Change in Paris, France. She states on her website that the most memorable moment in her career was receiving President Obama’s Champion of Change Award in 2012 for her activism as a spoken word poet/organizer in her Pacific Islander community.

Works 

 Raise Up - Terisa Siagatonu, Millennium Stage, November 10, 2014
  "Trigger" Terisa Siagatonu Button Poetry, December 21, 2014
"Moana Means Home" Terisa Siagatonu, April 21, 2018
"Ethnic Studies" Ink Knows No Borders, March 3, 2019

References 

Samoan women poets
Year of birth missing (living people)
Living people
Slam poets